Notorious is the second studio album by American country music band Confederate Railroad. It was released in 1994 by Atlantic Records Nashville. It peaked at #6 on the US country albums chart, and #13 on the Canadian country albums chart, and was certified platinum by the RIAA. "Summer In Dixie" became their first single to miss the top 40 in the United States.

"I Am Just a Rebel" was previously recorded by Billy Hill on their 1989 album of the same name, and later by Billy Hill member Dennis Robbins on his 1992 album Man with a Plan and was later recorded by Joy Lynn White on her 1994 album Wild Love. "Redneck Romeo" was originally recorded by The Forester Sisters on 1992's I Got a Date.

Track listing

Personnel 
As listed in liner notes

Confederate Railroad 
 Mark Dufresne - drums
 Michael Lamb - electric guitar, background vocals
 Chris McDaniel - keyboards, background vocals
 Gates Nichols - steel guitar, background  vocals
 Wayne Secrest - bass guitar
 Danny Shirley - lead vocals

Additional musicians 
 Eddie Bayers - drums
 Barry Beckett - keyboards
 Bruce Bouton - steel guitar, synthesizer
 Gary Burr - background vocals
 Paul Franklin - steel guitar
 "Cowboy" Eddie Long - steel guitar
 Phil Naish - keyboards
 Russ Pahl - dobro
 Suzi Ragsdale - background vocals
 Tom Roady - percussion
 Michael Rhodes - bass guitar
 Brent Rowan - electric guitar
 Harry Stinson - background vocals
 Billy Joe Walker, Jr. - acoustic guitar
 Hurshel Wiginton - background vocals
 Dennis Wilson - background vocals
 Curtis Young - background vocals

Charts

Weekly charts

Year-end charts

Singles

References 

Atlantic Records albums
Confederate Railroad albums
1994 albums
Albums produced by Barry Beckett